United Nations Security Council Resolution 234, was adopted on June 7, 1967, after its appeal to the governments concerned to immediately cease all military activities in the Near East failed. The Council, concerned with the possibility of a broader conflict, demanded that the governments involved discontinue all military activities by 20:00 GMT on June 7, 1967.  The Council also requested that the Secretary-General keep them promptly and currently informed on the situation.

The meeting was called by the Soviet Union and the resolution passed unanimously. Jordan and Israel accepted the resolution, provided other parties accepted as well. The following day the United Arab Republic also accepted the ceasefire solution, on condition of reciprocity.

See also
List of United Nations Security Council Resolutions 201 to 300 (1965–1971)
Six-Day War

References

External links
 
Text of the Resolution at undocs.org

 0234
Six-Day War
Israeli–Palestinian conflict and the United Nations
 0234
June 1967 events